Bormamian (also Romanized as Bormāmīān, Bormāmeyān, and Barmāmīān; also known as Barmayūn) is a village in Babuyi Rural District, Basht District, Basht County, Kohgiluyeh and Boyer-Ahmad Province, Iran. At the 2006 census, its population was 139, in 31 families.

References 

Populated places in Basht County